The WTA 125K series was the secondary professional tennis circuit organised by the Women's Tennis Association. The 2015 WTA 125K series calendar consists of six tournaments, each with a total prize fund of $125,000. After 2014, both the Suzhou, and Ningbo events folded, with Suzhou being replaced by a tournament in Dalian, and new events starting in Carlsbad and Hua Hin.

Schedule

Statistical information 
These tables present the number of singles (S) and doubles (D) titles won by each player and each nation during the season. The players/nations are sorted by: 1) total number of titles (a doubles title won by two players representing the same nation counts as only one win for the nation); 2) a singles > doubles hierarchy; 3) alphabetical order (by family names for players).

To avoid confusion and double counting, these tables should be updated only after an event is completed.

Titles won by player

Titles won by nation

Points distribution

References

 
2015 in tennis
2015